Charles IV may refer to:

 Charles IV of France (1294–1328), "the Fair"
 Charles IV, Holy Roman Emperor (1316–1378)
 Charles IV of Navarre (1421–1461)
 Charles IV, Duke of Anjou (1446–1481)
 Charles IV, Duke of Alençon (1489–1525)
 Charles, Duke of Vendôme (1489–1537), also known as Charles IV de Bourbon
 Charles V, Holy Roman Emperor (1500–1558), King of Naples as Charles IV
 Charles IV, Duke of Lorraine (1604–1675)
 Charles VI, Holy Roman Emperor (1685–1740), Duke of Brabant and King of Sicily as Charles IV
 Charles Emmanuel IV of Sardinia (1751–1819), styled "Charles IV of England and Scotland" by Jacobites
 Charles IV of Spain (1748–1819)
 Charles IV of Norway (1826–1872)
 Charles IV of Hungary (1887–1922)

See also 
 King Charles (disambiguation)

eo:Karolo (regantoj)#Karolo la 4-a